is a railway station on the Keio Inokashira Line in Shibuya, Tokyo, Japan, operated by the private railway operator Keio Corporation.

Lines

Service pattern
Only all-stations "Local" services stop at this station.

Station layout
The station has two opposing side platforms at ground level on either side of the two tracks, which are side by side. The station building is built above the tracks. Although it is considered to be an above-ground station, most of the station is actually within a tunnel so it is somewhat like an underground station.

The effective length of the platform was once only enough to accommodate three 18 m long train cars. As a result, the doors on two cars of trains coming from Kichijoji would not open (even earlier, there was also a period in which some trains simply bypassed the station altogether). The ticket gate and station building on the Shibuya end of the station was extremely simple, in contrast to the current station, which includes a store and entrance on the Shōtō side.

Later, when the Keio 1000 series trains were introduced, which had 20-meter cars, the platform was extended by construction into the tunnel, and starting on September 28, 1995, all doors on trains stopping at the station could open. During the period when the doors would not open, on the inside of the tunnel outside the unopening doors was written the words, .

Along with the construction in 1995 of the tunnel, construction to renovate the station as a whole was begun and on December 2, 1996, the current station was opened.

There are elevators between both platforms and the ticket gates.

The toilet is located on the upper level by the ticket gates. It includes a multi-purpose toilet, intended to as part of the station’s scheme of universal design.

The station was selected for the  feature by the former , now part of the Ministry of Land, Infrastructure, Transport and Tourism.

Platforms

History
The station opened on August 1, 1933.

From February 22, 2013, station numbering was introduced on Keio lines, with Shinsen Station becoming "IN02".

Passenger statistics
In fiscal 2011, the station was used by an average of 9,871 passengers daily.

The passenger figures for previous years are as shown below.

Surrounding area 
While rents are high in Shinsen, due to the close proximity to Shibuya, cheaper options are to be found nearer the Dogenzaka side of the station, which is predominantly made up of apartments for single occupants. This area was well known for its love hotels, though in recent years the area has been redeveloped due to a string of trendy new restaurants, bars, and izakayas. Shinsen is also host to a burgeoning artistic community with galleries, livehouses and studios.

References

External links

 Shinsen Station information (Keio) 

Railway stations in Japan opened in 1933
Stations of Keio Corporation
Buildings and structures in Shibuya
Keio Inokashira Line
Railway stations in Tokyo